is a Japanese businessman and current chairman of Mitsubishi Corporation. He previously served as President and CEO from April 2010 to April 2016. He has held a position with the company since 1971. Kobayashi received bachelor's degree in law from the University of Tokyo in 1971.

Career
Since becoming CEO, Kobayashi was able to effectively manage the company to an ROA of 1.5%.

References 

1949 births
Living people
Japanese chairpersons of corporations
Japanese chief executives
University of Tokyo alumni